Cydia pyrivora, the pear fruit moth or pear tortricid, is a moth of the family Tortricidae. It is found in Latvia, the Czech Republic, Slovakia, Sardinia, Sicily, the Italian mainland, Austria, Hungary, Yugoslavia, Romania, Bulgaria, Algeria, the island of Crete in Greece, Ukraine and southern and central Russia.

The wingspan is 17–22 mm. Adults are on wing in the second half of June in Austria and from May to June in Russia. There is one generation per year.

The larvae feed on Pyrus species. It is an important pest of pear. The larvae bore into the fruit and feed on the pips. The initial hole closes again, only leaving a small brown spot, making the presence of larvae hard to detect. When the larva is fully developed it leaves the fruit through a hole, leaving the fruit susceptible to fungal infection.

External links
Eurasian Tortricidae

Grapholitini
Moths of Europe
Moths described in 1947